The 1st Regional Command under the Vietnam People's Navy (VPN) is an independent naval warfare command that manages and protects the waters from Quảng Ninh to Hà Tĩnh and the islands in the Gulf of Tonkin, including the Quảng Ninh provinces, Haiphong, Thái Bình, Nam Định, Ninh Bình, Thanh Hóa, Nghệ An, Hà Tĩnh.

History 

 On October 26, 1975, 1st Coastal Region (Vùng Duyên hải 1) was established under the Naval Command.
 In 1978, Coastal Region 1 changed its name to 1st Naval Region Command of the Navy (Bộ Chỉ huy Vùng 1 Hải quân).
 On 14 January 2011, the 1st Naval Region Command was upgraded to the 1st Regional Command (Bộ Tư lệnh Vùng 1 Hải quân).

Current leadership 

 Commander: Rear Admiral Nguyễn Viết Khánh (former Deputy Commander - Chief of Staff of 1st Regional Command).
 Political Commissar: Colonel Hồ Thanh Hoàn (former Deputy Political Commissar of 1st Regional Command).
 Deputy Commander - Chief of Staff: Colonel Lê Đình Cường.
 Deputy Commander: Colonel Vũ Đình Duẩn (former Deputy Chief of Staff of 1st Regional Command).
 Deputy Commander: Colonel Phan Tiến Bảo.
 Deputy Political Commissar: Colonel Trần Xuân Văn.

Organisation 

 Advisory Department
 Political Department
 Logistics Department
 Technical Department
 Financial Committee
 170th Warship Brigade 
 679th Shore Missile Brigade
 147th Naval Infantry Brigade
 137th Squadron
 4th Squadron 
 151st Shore Radar Battalion
 158th Battalion 
 703rd Warehouse

Bonus 

 Third-class Fatherland Defense Order (2010)

Commander through the ages 

 1985, Phạm Minh, Rear Admiral (1991)
 1991, Quách Văn Nấu, Colonel (2010)
 Trần Đình Xuyên, Colonel (2008)
 2010-2015, Phạm Văn Điển, Rear Admiral (2011)
 2015-2016, Nguyễn Trọng Bình, Rear Admiral
 2016-2019, Trần Ngọc Quyết, Rear Admiral
 2019-present, Nguyễn Viết Khánh, Colonel

Politics through the ages 

 1977-1980 Colonel Cao Xuân Ấn (Hà Tĩnh)
 1980-1983 Colonel Lê Nguyên Tham (Hà Nam)
 2009-2014, Phạm Văn Sơn, Rear Admiral
 2014-2016, Phạm Văn Vững, Rear Admiral
 2016-2019, Phạm Văn Quang, Rear Admiral
 2019-present, Hồ Thanh Hoàn, Colonel

See also 

 2nd Regional Command.
 3rd Regional Command.
 4th Regional Command.
 5th Regional Command.

Notes 

Regional Command, Vietnam People's Navy